Ninomiya (written: 二宮 or 二ノ宮 lit. "second shrine") is a Japanese family name.

Notable people

General 
 Ayano Ninomiya, award-winning Japanese violinist 
 Chūhachi Ninomiya, Japanese inventor and aviation pioneer
 Kazunari Ninomiya, member of the band Arashi and an actor in the 2006 film Letters from Iwo Jima
 Kent Ninomiya, first male Asian American to be a primary news anchor of a US television station
 Ninomiya Sontoku (born Ninomiya Kinjirō), prominent 19th-century Japanese agricultural leader, philosopher, moralist and economist, whose statues of him reading while walking are commonly seen near Japanese schools
 Tei Ninomiya, first Asian student at Smith College, later an administrator for YWCA in Japan
 Tomoko Ninomiya, Japanese manga artist

Athletics
 Hiroshi Ninomiya (born in 1937), Japanese football player and manager
 Hiroshi Ninomiya (born in 1969), Japanese football player
 Hirokazu Ninomiya, Japanese football player and manager
 Jōkō Ninomiya, Grandmaster, founder and director of Enshin Karate
 Kazuhiro Ninomiya, 1976 Olympic gold medalist and two-time world judo champion
 Kazuhiro Ninomiya (footballer), Japanese football player
 Makoto Ninomiya, Japanese tennis player
 Miho Ninomiya, Japanese judoka

Fictional characters 
Ninomiya, the main character in the light novel series Goshūshō-sama Ninomiya-kun
Ninomiya-kun, of the fictional Sensei and Ninomiya in Minami-ke
, a character in the anime series Gatchaman Crowds

Eponyms 
 Nielsen-Ninomiya theorem, a no-go theorem in physics by Holger Bech Nielsen and Masao Ninomiya
 Hōtoku Ninomiya Shrine, Japanese Shinto shrine in Odawara, Kanagawa dedicated to Ninomiya Sontoku

See also 
 Ninomiya (disambiguation), especially for place-related uses 
 
 

Japanese-language surnames